The 2020 Democrats Abroad presidential primary took place from March 3 to March 10, 2020, between Super Tuesday and the following multi-primary cluster in the next week, as a global vote during the Democratic Party primaries for the 2020 presidential election, allowing American citizens living outside the United States, who were members of Democrats Abroad, to participate in the nomination process. Voting took place at more than 230 voting stations in several countries, as well as via e-mail and postal voting, with major voting events held on Super Tuesday, the following weekend and the other multi-primary Tuesday. The Democrats Abroad party-run primary awarded 21 delegates towards the 2020 Democratic National Convention, representing 17 votes, of which 13 were pledged delegates allocated on the basis of the results of the process.

Results were announced on March 23, 2020. Senator Bernie Sanders won the primary with a strong result of around 58% of the vote, gaining 9 delegates. Former vice president Joe Biden attained almost 23% of the vote and 4 delegates, while senator Elizabeth Warren, who had withdrawn from the presidential race two days after Super Tuesday but had not formally taken her name off the ballot, still received around 14% of the vote, beneath the threshold to gain any delegates.

Procedure
The Democrats Abroad party-run global primary ran from March 3 (Super Tuesday) to March 10, 2020, at hundreds of voting centers around the world. Votes were also cast by fax, email, or post. 

Eligibility: Voters had to meet the following criteria to vote
 Be abroad and be a U.S. citizen
 Be a member of Democrats Abroad
 Be 18 as of November 3, 2020
 Not have voted, nor plan to vote, in any other 2020 state presidential primary
Voters abroad also voted by downloading a ballot and emailing or postal mailing it to Democrats Abroad from February 18, 2020. Ballots must have been received prior to 12:00 a.m. Pacific Standard Time on March 11, 2020. No proxy voting was permitted. It was not possible for voters to change their vote if their supported candidate had officially withdrawn from the ballot during the voting period.

Candidates had to meet a threshold of 15 percent in order to be allocated pledged delegates to the National Convention. The 13 pledged delegates to the 2020 Democratic National Convention were allocated proportionally on the basis of the results of the party-run primary, also classified as a caucus, including 9 at-large regional delegates (divided between three world regions), one global PLEO delegate (party leader and elected official) and three at-large global delegates. As part of Stage I on the primary timetable there were no bonus delegates for a March contest on a joint date in that year.

Regional conventions were held online (originally planned as regional caucuses during the global convention in Toronto, Canada) for the Americas, Asia-Pacific, and Europe-Middle East-Africa regions on May 16, 2020 and May 17, 2020, selecting 9 national convention delegates, with the number each region was eligible to designate dependent on the proportion of ballots within each region, 6 for Europe-Middle East-Africa, 2 for the Americas, and 1 for Asia-Pacific. Between May 16 and May 17, 2020, the global convention also met online to elect a sole pledged PLEO delegate and 3 at-large delegates for the Democratic National Convention. The delegation also included 8 unpledged delegates: 8 members of the Democratic National Committee, who each had a half vote (meaning 4 unpledged delegate votes).

Candidates 

The following people have filed and were on the Democrats Abroad ballot when voting began:

Running

Joe Biden
Michael Bloomberg
Tulsi Gabbard
Bernie Sanders
Elizabeth Warren

Withdrawn

Pete Buttigieg
Amy Klobuchar
Deval Patrick
Tom Steyer
Andrew Yang

Cory Booker and Michael Bennet originally also qualified, but officially withdrew from the ballot before the primary. Bloomberg and Warren suspended their respective presidential campaigns on March 4 and March 5, while the primary was going on, with Bloomberg also officially withdrawing from the ballot on March 7, not being eligible for the rest of the voting period.

Results 

Results of the primary were announced on Monday, March 23, 2020.

Results by country

Notes

References

External links
The Green Papers delegate allocation summary
Delegate selection plan

Democrats Abroad Democratic
2020